Yuliya Bohachova (born 7 September 1970) is a Ukrainian breaststroke and medley swimmer. She competed in two events at the 1988 Summer Olympics representing the Soviet Union.

References

External links
 

1970 births
Living people
Ukrainian female breaststroke swimmers
Ukrainian female medley swimmers
Olympic swimmers of the Soviet Union
Swimmers at the 1988 Summer Olympics
Place of birth missing (living people)
Soviet female breaststroke swimmers
Soviet female medley swimmers